Neela is a 2001 Indian Kannada-language drama film directed by T. S. Nagabharana and written by Kotiganahalli Ramaiah. Featuring Gayatri Jayaraman in the lead protagonist role, it also stars Ananth Nag,Mayoori, Shivadhwaj, Jayanthi and Naveen Mayur in key roles.

The story is about a nomadic folk singer, Neela, who belongs to the "Neelagararu" tribe. She develops throat cancer and suddenly loses her voice. The story highlights her struggle to survive in her conservative society.

Neela was screened at the Indian Panorama international festival and won many accolades for the content. The film won the third best film at the Karnataka State Film Awards, and Gayatri Jayaraman won Best Actress at the Cinema Express Awards.

Cast 
 Gayatri Jayaraman as Neela
 Shivadhwaj as Sanjeeva
 Ananth Nag as Shivajja
 Sarath Babu as Palegar Jagadevaraya
 Jayanthi as Jagadevaraya's mother
 Rangayana Raghu as Siddayya, Neela's father
 Naveen Mayur as Karthik
 Enagi Nataraj as History professor
 Mayoori as Chandri, Jagadevaraya's daughter
 Picchalli Srinivas as mute person
 Apoorva Bargur as Geethanjali

Soundtrack

The music was composed by the renowned composer Vijaya Bhaskar, his last work before his death. The soundtrack consisted of 12 tracks most of which were sung by acclaimed playback singer Vani Jairam.

References

External links 
 Neela songs at MIO
 

2001 films
2000s Kannada-language films
Films scored by Vijaya Bhaskar
Films directed by T. S. Nagabharana